Kilima is a genus of African orb-weaver spiders first described by M. Grasshoff in 1970.  it contains only three species.

References

Araneidae
Araneomorphae genera
Spiders of Africa